The Polikarpov TIS was a heavily armed Soviet heavy fighter designed during the early 1940s. Competing contemporaneous designs in the USSR included the Grushin Gr-1, Mikoyan-Gurevich DIS and Tairov Ta-3.

Only two prototypes were built because its intended engines proved to be too unreliable to be placed into production and the engines' manufacturer lacked the resources to fix the problems. 

The second prototype crashed in September 1944 and the program was canceled after the death of Nikolai Nikolaevich Polikarpov, the chief designer of his eponymous OKB, earlier that year.

Design and development
The original request for proposals for a heavy escort fighter (Tyazholyy Istrebitel' Soprovozhdeniya) was received at the Polikarpov OKB in November 1938, but the press of work with the I-180 and SPB prototypes prevented any significant design work until the third quarter of 1940. Mikhail Yangel was appointed head designer, but his job was complicated by multiple changes in the role of the aircraft from escort fighter to interceptor, dive bomber, and eventually reconnaissance.

The prototype, internally designated as aircraft or TIS "A", was a low-wing, all-metal, cantilever monoplane with two Mikulin AM-37 engines and a twin tail. The monocoque fuselage had four  ShKAS machine guns in the nose, each with 1,000 rounds. The pilot and the gunner/radio-operator were seated back-to-back, separated by an armor plate, under sliding canopies. The gunner had a dorsal ShKAS on a TSS-1 mount with 750 rounds that could be used once his canopy was slid forward. He also had a ventral ShKAS mounted below the armored floor that he could access by raising a hatch in the floor and kneeling down to fire the machine guns. The ventral gun was provided with 500 rounds of ammunition. A  UBK machine gun with 400 rounds and a  ShVAK cannon with 350 rounds were mounted in each wing root. Underneath the wings were two racks each capable of carrying a single  FAB-500 bomb. The wing had automatic leading edge slats and four split flaps separated by the engine nacelles. The single wheel landing gear retracted into the rear part of the nacelles, as did the tailwheel into the fuselage.

It suffered from a lack of directional stability and the engines were unreliable and vibrated above . Factory No. 51 attempted to fix the stability problem in late September by increasing the area of the rear fins, but was unsuccessful. Flight testing continued in October in Novosibirsk, to where the LII (—Flight Research Institute) had been evacuated. Eliminating the stability problem took until March 1942, although the engines remained as unreliable as ever.

By the summer of 1942 it was clear that the Mikulin OKB lacked the resources to fix the problems with the AM-37 and that the TIS would need a new engine, but the OKB's resources were fully utilized on the I-185 and ITP programs and the TIS program was put on hold. Work did not resume on the TIS until the second half of 1943, after the I-185 had been canceled, and the Mikulin AM-39 engine was selected. A new prototype was built, internally called the "MA", with a completely revised armament. Two ShVAK cannon replaced the nose ShKAS machine guns and a UBT machine gun in a VUB-1 mount replaced the dorsal ShKAS, while the ventral machine gun was removed entirely. Two  Shpitalny Sh-37 or  111P cannon replaced the wing root guns. The intended AM-39s were unavailable and therefore two Mikulin AM-38Fs were used as a temporary expedient. The engine radiators were moved from the nacelles into the wings. They were fed by inlets in the leading edge and outlets on the undersurface of the wing.

Operational history
The "MA" was flight tested from June to September 1944 and generally met its expected performance figures. A brake failure on 29 June damaged the "MA", which required a month to repair, but a crash-landing on 16 September caused by the failure of the undercarriage to extend proved to be the death knell for the TIS program. The OKB was being shut down after Polikarpov's death at the end of June and there was no one willing to champion the TIS.

Specifications (TIS (A))

See also

References
Notes

Bibliography

 Gordon, Yefim. Soviet Airpower in World War 2. Hinckley, UK: Midland Publishing, 2008. .
 Green, William and Gordon Swanborough. The Complete Book of Fighters. New York: Smithmark, 1994. .
 Gunston, Bill. The Osprey Encyclopedia of Russian Aircraft 1875-1995. London: Osprey, 1995. .
 Townend, David R. Clipped Wings – World War Two Edition. Markham, Ontario: Aerofile Publications, 2010. .

1940s Soviet fighter aircraft
ITP
Twin piston-engined tractor aircraft
Aircraft first flown in 1941